Jazztronik is a Japanese music group by the Tokyo-based DJ/producer/pianist  Ryota Nozaki, that does not have fixed members. Jazztronik has released two albums and two EPs since 1998 on label Flower Records. In 2001 Jazztronik also released the album "Inner Flight" on Counterpoint, a UK label.

Jazztronik has been growing in popularity and has hit sales of 100,000+. Jazztronik performs to sold-out crowds all across the Japanese club scene, and his growth in America and Europe has helped him reach popularity in the English club scene.

See also
Japanese jazz

References

 http://internacional-theurbansound.blogspot.com.es/2007/09/jazztronik-nuestro-japn-jazz-beats.html
 http://thisplaylist.com/song/play-mp3/davide-giovannini-sonia-santana-verdades.html
 http://e-daylight.jp/music/club/jazztronik/index.html

External links 
 Jazztronik — official website.
 Especial Records — label website.
 Jazztronik discography at Discogs.

Japanese electronic music groups
Japanese jazz ensembles
Musical groups from Tokyo
Downtempo musicians